Shinkawa may refer to:

Shinkawa, Aichi, a former town in Nishikasugai District, Aichi Prefecture, Japan
Shinkawa Station (Hokkaido), a railway station in Kita-ku, Sapporo, Hokkaido, Japan
 , an area and artificial island in the ward of Chūō, Tokyo
 , an area in Mitaka city, Tokyo, location of Kyorin University

People with the surname
, Japanese writer and lawyer
, Japanese illustrator
, Japanese actress and model

See also
 Arakawa (disambiguation)

Japanese-language surnames
ja:新川